Route 137 is a main highway running north/south through the city of Stamford, Connecticut.

Route description
Route 137 begins as a 4-lane/6-lane divided arterial road from US 1 in downtown Stamford, heading north to an interchange with Route 15 (Merritt Parkway). The route then continues as a 2-lane road all the way to the New York state line in the town of Pound Ridge, New York. Past its south end at US 1, the roadway of Route 137 continues for another  to I-95, designated as Special Service Road 493 (SSR 493).

The section of Route 137 from High Ridge Road to the state line is designated the Yankee Division Highway.

History
The route was commissioned in 1932 with the southern half running along a slightly different alignment than the current route. In the 1920s, this route had been known as State Highway 318. The original path of Route 137 consisted only of High Ridge Road. Its southern terminus was located at the intersection of Long Ridge Road (Route 104), Summer and Bedford Streets, also known as "Bull's Head", in Stamford.  Since 1976, Route 137 follows High Ridge Road south onto Cold Spring Road and onto Washington Boulevard and ends at Tresser Boulevard (US 1) in front of the Stamford Government Center. Route 104, which originally extended south into downtown Stamford using Bedford and Summer Street, was cut back to end at its current southern terminus at the same time.

A freeway upgrading of Route 137 was proposed in 1969 connecting downtown Stamford and the town center of Pound Ridge but was never implemented due to local opposition. The road also might have continued south to a proposed bridge to Long Island (see Long Island Crossing).

The ramp from Route 137 north to the Parkway southbound has one of the few jughandle ramps in Connecticut.

Major intersections

References

External links

Pound Ridge-Stamford Expressway at nycroads.com

137
Transportation in Stamford, Connecticut
Transportation in Fairfield County, Connecticut